"Automatic" is a 2010 single by Canadian singer Danny Fernandes featuring Canadian rapper Belly from Fernandes's second studio album AutomaticLUV.

"Automatic", released on CP Records, is the first single from his new album after five consecutive singles from his debut album Intro.

Music video
In the video (directed by Mike Portoghese), Danny Fernandes plays a robot version of himself. Belly plays a cyborg commanding an army of faceless troops. MuchMusic observed influence from Janet Jackson's "Feedback" video in its cyborg theme. The video girl features Canadian actress Lana Tailor (who also appears again in Take Me Away).

Chart performance
The song debuted at number 82 on the week of September 25, 2010. A month later, it peaked at number 41 on the week of November 6, 2010 and later spent an additional thirteen weeks on the chart.

References

External links

2010 singles
2010 songs
Danny Fernandes songs
Belly (rapper) songs
CP Music Group singles
Songs written by Belly (rapper)
Songs written by Danny Fernandes

Canadian dance songs
Canadian pop songs